Wellington Street is a street located in Covent Garden, Westminster, London. It connects Bow Street, Russell Street, Tavistock Street, Exeter Street, Strand and Lancaster Place.

The street takes its name from Arthur Wellesley, 1st Duke of Wellington.

Location
Wellington Street runs south east to north west from Strand to Bow Street. The nearest tube station is Covent Garden.

Buildings
Lyceum Theatre is located on Wellington Street.

References

Streets in the City of Westminster
Covent Garden